Theudebert II (c.585-612), King of Austrasia (595–612 AD), was the son and heir of Childebert II. He received the kingdom of Austrasia plus the cities (civitates) of Poitiers, Tours, Le Puy-en-Velay, Bordeaux, and Châteaudun, as well as the Champagne, the Auvergne, and Transjurane Alemannia.

During his early years, his grandmother Brunhilda ruled for Theudebert and his brother Theuderic II, who had received the realm of Burgundy. After the two brothers reached adulthood, they were often at war, with Brunhilda siding with Theuderic. In 599, Theuderic defeated Theudebert at Sens, but then the two brothers allied against their cousin Chlothar II and defeated him at Dormelles (near Montereau), thereby laying their hands on a great portion of Neustria (600–604). At this point, however, the two brothers took up arms against each other; Theuderic defeated Theudebert at Étampes. In 605, Theudebert refused to aid his brother whose kingdom was invaded by Clothar II. In 610, Theudebert extorted Alsace from his brother and Theuderic took up arms against him, yet again.

Theudebert was defeated decisively by Theuderic at Toul and at Zülpich in 612. Theudebert was locked up in a monastery at the order of his grandmother, and killed with his son Merovech.

He was married to Bilichildis. His daughter Emma is sometimes thought to have married Eadbald of Kent.

Sources

Sources

Merovingian kings
Frankish warriors
586 births
612 deaths
Medieval child monarchs
6th-century Frankish kings
Murdered royalty
7th-century Frankish kings